Li Peifu (born October 1953) is a Chinese novelist best known for his novel The Book of Life, which won him China's top literature prize: Mao Dun Literature Prize, in 2015. Li is a member of the Chinese Communist Party and the China Writers Association. He was selected as a National First-class Writer by the Chinese government, and enjoys the special subsidy of the State Council.

Biography
Li was born into a  worker's family, in Xuchang, Henan, in October 1953. He started to publish works in 1978, after the Cultural Revolution. He graduated from Henan Radio and Television University in 1984, where he majored in Chinese language and literature. After graduation, he worked at Xuchang Municipal Bureau of Culture and later became president of the Henan Writers Association and Henan Literature and Art Association. On August 16, 2015, he was awarded the Mao Dun Literature Prize for his novel The Book of Life. His most influential work is The Book of Life, which he finished in 2011, and which won him the prestigious Mao Dun Literature Prize in 2015. The Book of Life is also the finale of his Plains Trilogy, after the 1999 Door of the Sheepfold and the 2003 The Light of the Cities.

Works

Novellas
 Black Dragonfly
 Cunhun
 The Countryside
 Collected Works of Li Peifu

Novels
 The 17th Generation Great-Great-Grandson of Li Family
 Golden House
 Urban White Paper
 Door of the Sheepfold
 The Light of the Cities
 The Book of Life or A Record of Life
 Graft, trans. James Trapp (Sinoist Books, 2022)

Telescript
 * The Story of Ying River
 * Ordinary Story
 * Memorable Years: Stories of Red Flag Canal
 * Shen Fengmei

Awards
1994 Zhaung Zhongwen Literature Prize

2012 The Book of Life – People's Literature Award

2015 The Book of Life – Mao Dun Literature Prize

References

1953 births
Living people
Writers from Xuchang
Henan University alumni
Chinese male novelists
Mao Dun Literature Prize laureates
People's Republic of China novelists